James Pinckney Hart (November 11, 1904 – May 10, 1987) was a justice of the Supreme Court of Texas from October 1, 1947, to November 15, 1950.  He was elected as the inaugural Chancellor of the University of Texas System on July 24, 1950, and served in the position until January 1, 1954.

References

Justices of the Texas Supreme Court
1904 births
1987 deaths
20th-century American judges
20th-century American academics